Uyun al-Wadi (also spelled Oyoun Alwadi) is a village in northern Syria located northwest of Homs in the Homs Governorate. It is located just west of Mashta al-Helu. According to the Syria Central Bureau of Statistics, Uyun al-Wadi had a population of 772 in the 2004 census. Its inhabitants are predominantly Greek Orthodox Christians.

References

Populated places in Homs District
Eastern Orthodox Christian communities in Syria